The Hackney was a marque of microcar which seated one adult or two children, built in the mid-to-later 1950s by the Gordon W. Morton Company of High Point Road in Greensboro, North Carolina. Hubert H. Hackney applied for a patent for this miniature car design on August 19, 1955, and the patent was approved by the United States Patent Office on March 19, 1957 for a term of 14 years. 

The Hackney somewhat resembled the concurrent Eshelman automobile, but differed in its most remarkable engineering features, which included what the manufacturer termed its "Floating Power Unit" (FPU)—a self-contained rear-mounted engine, clutch, and drivetrain combination—in concert with the rear wheels and independent of the body. The FPU was mounted on pivots at front and back. Also, a floorboard-mounted one-stick control operated both forward and rear motions, and even operated braking action. The throttle control was mounted on the dashboard; a rope-recoil starter was used.

Two models were offered; the Standard and the Deluxe, with the latter model featuring a wraparound Plexiglas windshield in then-contemporary fashion, an electric horn, head and tail lamps, and a lightning-bolt trim design on the flanks. Bumpers and a trailer hitch were standard on all models.

The squarish-looking Hackney bodies were of sheet steel; a running change added small fins atop the rear fenders on later models. Standard factory colors were red with white trim and wheels.

Engines were supplied by several manufacturers but extant Hackney cars usually have a 2 HP Clinton four-cycle powerplant, which allowed speeds to six mph.

Hackney moved lived and died in Greensboro NC built cabs, bodies, and commercial equipment.

Advertising claims
The Hackney was marketed, according to factory literature, as "Easy To Operate! Lots of fun! Any child can learn in a matter of minutes. Hackney Autos for Children - 3 to 103!""For inexpensive pleasure;"For genuine fun - it can't be beat for young and old alike;"For training - assure the youngsters a safe future on the highways by early training in your yard;"A safe and sturdy little car - designed for use in the smallest of yards with limited ground, sidewalk and driveway areas, or for the wide-open spaces;"Lowest priced car in its field. Simple enough for tots, thrilling enough for teenagers. Dads, too, can share in the fun, and teach children how to steer, make quick stops and park. It's a lot of fun, and educational, too, to teach them hand signals."Older children and adults will naturally set their own speed with the throttle. The car has enough zip and pep to 'spin a wheel' and thoroughly satisfy teenagers. Ample seat and leg room to accommodate a youth until he is old enough to get a driver's license for a big car. Enough room for the average size adult."''

Hackney cars were also marketed for amusement park use. At least one park placed an order for a fleet of Hackneys.

Dimensions

Length: 71 inches;

Width: 26½ inches;

Height: 19 inches (beltline to ground);

Weight: 185 pounds;

Wheels/tires: 10x2.75 semi-pneumatic;

Electrical: Six volts;

Steering: Center-point, tie-rods

Fuel consumption: 70 MPG.

A one-year factory warranty was included against material and workmanship defects.

See also
Crosley

External links

References

Microcars
Defunct motor vehicle manufacturers of the United States
Defunct manufacturing companies based in North Carolina